Quercus pennivenia is a species of oak in the family Fagaceae, native to northern Mexico.

Taxonomy
Quercus pennivenia was first described by William Trelease in 1924. It was later  synonymized with Quercus urbani, but was restored as an independent species in 2020. It is placed in Quercus sect. Lobatae.

Distribution
Quercus pennivenia is endemic to Mexico, from northern and southeastern Sinaloa to southwestern Durango.

References

pennivenia
Flora of Durango
Flora of Sinaloa
Plants described in 1924
Taxa named by William Trelease